The Rev. Dr. George McKendree Steele, D.D., LL.D. (April 13, 1823 – January 14, 1902) was an American educator and Methodist minister, president of Lawrence University in Appleton, Wisconsin from 1865 to 1879. He was the author of the 1876 pamphlet The Currency Question, which was regarded as a major statement of the philosophy of the Greenback movement; and was a Greenback Party nominee for Congress and other public office.

Biography 
Steele was born in Strafford, Vermont on April 13, 1823, one of seven children of Joel Steele (a Methodist minister) and Jerusha (Higgins) Steele. He spent his youth on a farm in his native town, with little formal schooling; but was able to attend Newbury Seminary, after which he taught briefly and then entered the Wesleyan University, from which he graduated in 1850.

He spent three years thereafter (1850–1853) as a teacher of Latin and mathematics at Wilbraham Wesleyan Academy in Wilbraham, Massachusetts, and married Susan J. Swift on July 1, 1852.

In 1892, Dr. Steele and his wife moved to Auburndale, Massachusetts, when he accepted a professorship at Lasell Seminary (now Lasell University).

He died in Kenilworth, Illinois in 1902.

References 

1823 births
1902 deaths
19th-century Methodist ministers
American Methodist clergy
Educators from Massachusetts
Presidents of Lawrence University
Wisconsin Greenbacks
19th-century American politicians
People from Strafford, Vermont
Vermont College of Fine Arts alumni
Wesleyan University alumni
19th-century American educators
19th-century American clergy